John MacNaughton may refer to:

 John MacNaughton (criminal) or 'Half Hung MacNaghten', Irish figure of 18th century romantic folklore
 John A. MacNaughton, Canadian former CEO of the CPP Investment Board